Jackson Avery, M.D., F.A.C.S. is a fictional character in the ABC prime time medical drama, Grey's Anatomy, portrayed by actor Jesse Williams. The character was created by series creator and executive producer, Shonda Rhimes. He was introduced in season 6 episode "Invasion" as a surgical resident formerly from Mercy West Medical Center when it merges with Seattle Grace Hospital.

Williams initially appeared as a recurring cast member, and was later promoted to a series regular in season 7. The character's main storyline involves Jackson trying to achieve success on his own instead of riding on the coattails of his surgeon grandfather's high reputation. He specializes in plastic surgery after working with chief Mark Sloan (Eric Dane) in season 7, and later became chief of the department himself. Jackson had five relationships with, in order, Lexie Grey (Chyler Leigh), April Kepner (Sarah Drew) Stephanie Edwards, April Kepner (Sarah Drew) (again), Maggie Pierce, Victoria Hughes, Jo Wilson, and April Kepner (Sarah Drew) (again).  He married Kepner and had two children: a son, Samuel, who died of osteogenesis imperfecta type II, and a daughter named Harriet. Avery left Seattle with former spouse April Kepner (Sarah Drew) to run the Catherine Fox foundation. On the 400th episode of the show, Jackson returned to Seattle and it was revealed that he and April had rekindled their romantic relationship while living in Boston.

Storylines
Jackson Avery is the grandson of Harper Avery, one of the most famous surgeons in the country and the namesake of the prestigious Harper Avery Award. The younger Avery grew up hearing at his grandmother's dinner table about the nobility of being a surgeon, which inspired him to pursue that career. His father, Robert (Eric Roberts), "ran off to God knows where because he couldn't stand the pressure of being an Avery", and his mother, Catherine nee Fox (Debbie Allen), raised him alone. He says that in his family, he was identified as "just the pretty one" and they never pushed him academically, so he pushed himself. Jackson is initially a surgical resident at Mercy West Hospital. Alongside April Kepner (Sarah Drew), Reed Adamson (Nora Zehetner), and Charles Percy (Robert Baker), he joins the staff at Seattle Grace Mercy West after the institutions are merged. His grandfather Harper Avery is affiliated with Harvard and has to be treated at the hospital; during this period, he tries to convince his grandson to transfer to Massachusetts General Hospital, which he can arrange, but the younger Avery refuses.

In the aftermath of a mass shooting at SGMW, in which 11 people are killed, Avery suffers PTSD. For comfort, he and Kepner both take rooms in the large house of fellow resident Meredith Grey (Ellen Pompeo). Also living there are her husband, Derek Shepherd (Patrick Dempsey), resident Alex Karev (Justin Chambers) and intern Lexie Grey (Chyler Leigh), her half-sister. For some time, Avery suffers because of the death of his friend Percy in the shooting, and having assisted in surgery on Shepherd while being threatened at gunpoint by the shooter. The seventh season shows Avery's emerging interest in Meredith's sister, Lexie Grey, and they start a relationship. Avery also starts working with chief of plastic surgery Mark Sloan (Eric Dane), who had previously had a relationship with Lexie. She is discomfited by the two men working together and, when she later shows that she still has feelings for Sloan, Avery breaks up with her.

As the end of the fifth year of residency is near, the surgical residents, including Avery, prepare for their board certifications as they prepare for fellowships. The night before taking the exam, Jackson and April Kepner have sexual intercourse. However, Kepner is a virgin and regrets having broken her promise to Jesus to stay a virgin until marriage; the two have sex again during the period of the exams. During the exam, Avery is supported by his mother, Catherine, who happens to be a tester at the exams.

Avery, Meredith Grey, Cristina Yang (Sandra Oh), and Alex Karev eventually pass their boards, while Kepner fails. Although Avery has true feelings for her, she pushes him away because she believes that he feels guilty for having sex with her. In the season eight finale, Avery reveals to April that he is taking the position at Tulane Medical Center, despite feeling sick for leaving Seattle Grace Mercy West and her behind. As a celebration of the conclusion of their residencies, the former chief of surgery Richard Webber (James Pickens, Jr.) organizes his annual dinner for them. The eighth season ends with Avery, Karev, Kepner, and Webber waiting for Meredith and Yang. They are victims of an aviation accident in which Lexie Grey and eventually Mark Sloan die of their injuries.

After the accident, Avery stays at Seattle Grace and continues his work in plastic surgery. He and Kepner continue a sexual relationship, although April is uneasy and believes she is pregnant. When she tells Avery, he proposes to her and she accepts, anticipating a happy wedding. But the pregnancy is false and the couple break up before announcing their engagement to the staff. As a means to avoid each other, the two doctors decide to each bring a date to Dr. Bailey's wedding, both of whom are interns.

After the wedding, Avery has sex in his car with his date, intern Stephanie Edwards (Jerrika Hinton). Shortly afterwards he tells Kepner about the incident, and she thanks him for his honesty. It is hinted that Avery still loves Kepner when she turns to him for dating advice and he shows jealousy. They re-establish a friendship. When the hospital faces a financial crisis, Avery's mother, Catherine, agrees to invest in the hospital via the Harper Avery foundation; but she insists that Avery be made chairman. The board (at Avery's suggestion) later renames the hospital as Grey Sloan Memorial Hospital. Kepner gets engaged to Matthew but at their wedding, Avery stands up to profess his love for her.

Kepner chooses Avery, and they run out of her wedding together. When Kepner regrets her decision, Avery proposes to her and they elope. They keep their marriage a secret from the rest of the hospital staff, because of a new rule restricting relations among the staff. Avery's ex-girlfriend Stephanie feels especially betrayed because of how he left her. Catherine Avery is not happy about her son's eloping with Kepner, as he failed to make a prenuptial agreement to protect the Avery family fortune. They make up after Kepner signs such an agreement.

Jackson and April soon hit a rough patch when they realize that they have different views about the way their children should be raised with respect to religion. Soon after their fight, April realizes she is pregnant. April and Jackson's baby is diagnosed during pregnancy with Osteogenesis Imperfecta type 2, and they learn that the baby will not survive long after birth. Jackson believes that termination is the best option; however, April would rather give birth to the baby, knowing it will not live very long. They schedule an induction for the next day, and at the beginning of the appointment, they are asked to sign their baby's death certificate, which is too hard for the couple to bear. April doesn't sign the papers and returns to work the same day praying for a miracle, while at work she has a heart-to-heart with a lady who lost her fiancée the night before. They decide to give birth to the baby via induction at 24 weeks gestation, having it baptized right then. She gives birth to Samuel Norbert Avery and he passes away shortly after birth.

In the season 11 finale, Kepner tells Avery that she is leaving with Owen Hunt (Kevin McKidd) to serve as a trauma surgeon in the Army; it will help her grieve for their son. Avery lets her go and wonders how he can deal with his own grief.  After discussions over the phone via Facetime, Kepner tells Avery that she is extending her service time. The sound of gunfire and explosions are heard at April's base camp, leaving her to quickly terminate the call. On Valentine's Day, Kepner returns to the hospital, where she and Avery embrace in the foyer.

In season 12, their marriage begins to fall apart and they grow estranged.  In episode 11, they file for a civil divorce.  After their divorce is completed, Kepner reveals that she is pregnant with Avery's child. In season 14, Jackson begins a relationship with Maggie Pierce (Kelly McCreary), but by Season 16, they break up. Soon after Jackson begins a short-lived relationship with Victoria Hughes of Station 19, though that ends as well. In Season 17, Jackson begins a friends-with-benefits relationship with Jo, though, towards the end of the season, Jackson realizes he wants to leave the hospital and take over the Harper Avery Foundation in Boston. He approaches April with the idea, and the two decide to move to Boston together with Harriet with the possibility of reconciliation.

On the show's 400th episode in Season 18, Jackson and April return to Seattle with Harriet. It is revealed that they reconciled while living in Boston. In season 19, Meredith visits Jackson in Boston where the two of them discuss her growing desire to cure Alzheimer's. He assures Meredith that she will have unlimited resources at his hospital, should she decide to accept a position there and move to Boston, which she ultimately does.

Development

Casting & Creation
In February 2009, Michael Ausiello hinted at the possibility of central character, Meredith Grey (Ellen Pompeo), having another sibling. The series had released a casting call for an actor who could pass as biracial; casting was postponed until season 6. Williams's casting was announced in late August 2009. Though his name is not given, the character's arc was expected to last several episodes. Williams described his audition as a "simple process." He got the information on his birthday, August 5, and went in the next day to read for the role, despite not knowing what part he had auditioned for. Williams learned he got the job a week later. In late 2009, a casting call for a young Ellis Grey and a young Richard Webber, who would appear in flashbacks, fueled rumors that Avery could be Meredith's half-brother. Williams later shot down the rumor, saying that Meredith would have noticed if her mother were pregnant. Matt Webb Mitovich noted Williams's absence from the Seattle Grace: On Call webseries as a sign of big plans for the character.

In the episode, "Perfect Little Accident," which premiered on March 4, 2010, Avery is revealed to be the grandson of the legendary Harper Avery (Chelcie Ross). Shonda Rhimes hinted at the possibility of Williams and his co-star Sarah Drew becoming series regulars in her blog post about the season finale in May 2010. Williams's promotion was eventually confirmed in June 2010.

Characterization
The character's profile on official ABC website describes Avery as "hardworking, driven, observant" and "eager." However, at times, Avery can be too confident and "overly competitive," and very "stubborn." He has a habit of teasing his coworkers. Williams revealed to Essence.com that his character is very "ambitious. He doesn't takes sides or deal with any drama. He's there to work and not really get involved in the pettiness." He describes the character as much more "cavalier," and bold. Matt Webb Mitovitch described Jackson as having a "sense of entitlement," while Williams described Jackson's demeanor as "swagger." Because his work environment is extremely competitive, Avery acts as if he belongs and refuses to second guess himself. Upon arrival at Seattle Grace, he is "kind of a wise ass surgeon." He feels he is an "invader" in the new team and "he decides to deal with it kind of aggressively and not shy away from it and show his personality. He is very confident and likes to say what is on his mind." Williams also said: "Jackson is more of a lone wolf. He's not really built to go seek support and a shoulder to cry on." "He's always been trying to make it on his own. Jackson doesn't want to live off his legacy and his name, which also conflicts with him wanting to be close to his mother."

Relationships
Jackson immediately clashes with Cristina Yang due to their competitive natures. The immediate tension between the duo leads to speculation about a potential romance. Yang and Avery compete for the same cases, and in the episode, "Invest in Love," for the first time, Jackson witnesses Cristina taking charge of a situation, and he admires her; he looks at her differently. At a party, when Jackson is a bit drunk, he opens up about how attractive he finds Cristina and kisses her. Jackson is unaware of Yang's relationship with Owen Hunt, so the attraction is natural. Williams does not worry about fans of the couple hating his character because he understands that fans aren't really supposed to like the Mercy Westers; Jackson is in the enemy camp and "has to take his lumps." Williams said the kiss was a "pretty relatable crime of passion." The kiss doesn't have any immediate effects on Owen and Cristina's romance and it remains secret. Jackson and Cristina develop a sort of mutual understanding as they tend to push one another to be better.

Speaking of Jackson's past relationship with Lexie Grey, Williams said: "He tried to be safe and wise and not deal with girls, really, when he first focused on transitioning into Seattle Grace from Mercy West. He kept his head down, got his work done and didn't get caught up with banging nurses or anything. But he couldn't help himself with Lexie once they got close; he really kind of fell for her. He made himself vulnerable probably to the least available person in the hospital, because he knew that she had a longstanding relationship with Mark. He knew he shouldn't head in that direction, but he went against his better judgment and got burned for it." "They are both kind of suckers for love [...] they both get caught up in their own momentum [...] he's all about his job and pressure from his grandfather but then he gets bowled over with this platonic relationship. Avery just can't help himself with Lexie."

At the end of the eighth season, April and Jackson's friendship evolved into an intimate relationship: "I thought they were going to be able to walk the line of staying on the friendship side of things. What they have is kind of really unique and organic in the world of Grey's Anatomy – two genders in a completely platonic, wholesome, pleasant and productive relationship/friendship. Who is to say that has to end?" In the ninth season, Jackson started a relationship with intern Stephanie Edward. Williams gave his insight: "That's a relationship that is fun, light, and no strings attached. She's sweet. She's funny. They aren't bogged down by these big notions of each other.
Jackson later declares his love for April at her wedding to EMT Matthew. They get married and have a child together, but he dies shortly after birth. Distraught and searching for purpose, April turns to the army and goes on tour with Owen, leaving Jackson at Grey-Sloan Memorial. After extending her leave several times, Jackson gives April an ultimatum that if she does not return immediately to Seattle, their relationship is over. April does not immediately return, and when she finally does, Jackson feels that April does not respect his needs in the relationship, especially after losing a child. The two try to make it work, but eventually come to the decision to end their marriage. April discover she's pregnant the day of their divorce proceedings, but does not disclose this until after the papers have been signed. In the fourteenth season Jackson begins a relationship with Maggie Pierce. That continues to deepen during season 15, and the couple move in together.  However after a disagreement on a camping trip, they decide to end things. 

Jackson was involved in a brief relationship with Victoria Hughes (from Station 19), and then a friends with benefits arrangement that took place during the Covid lockdown with Jo Wilson.  Jackson was unattached when he left Boston (and the show) at the end of Season 17.  He was leaving with his ex-wife and mother of his child, April Kepner, and it was implied that there could be a reunion.  On the show's 400th episode, Jackson and April returned to Seattle with Harriet for business and to see his mother who was battling cancer.  At the end of the episode, the couple embrace and kiss in the elevator, indicating that they have reunited while living in Boston.

Reception 

Margaret Lyons of Entertainment Weekly wrote the addition of Avery's character to the show was one of the 10 reasons she loves Grey's Anatomy again: "Dr. Avery wasn't quite clicking as part of the ensemble when Jesse Williams first joined the cast. But now? Oh, mama. He's flirty — to a fault — but he's also a decent dude, and the show was in need of a seriously single male character." His bromance with mentor Mark Sloan has been positively received. Janalen Samson of BuddyTV commented: "these scenes with Jesse Williams are proving to be gems. I do love a good bromance and these two actors are bringing the love and the funny in spades. The pairing was included in Zap2it'''s 25 Top Bromances of 2012. Reviewing the first part of the ninth season, Lyons said: "Avery's mom is more interesting than he is." He was listed in Wetpaint'''s "10 Hottest Male Doctors on TV".

References

External links 
 Jackson Avery at ABC.com
 Jackson Avery on IMDb

Fictional characters from California
Television characters introduced in 2009
Fictional surgeons
Grey's Anatomy characters
Fictional African-American people
American male characters in television